Sierraclava is a genus of pill beetles in the family Byrrhidae. There is one described species in Sierraclava, S. cooperi.

References

Further reading

 

Byrrhidae
Articles created by Qbugbot